"Tip It on Back" is a song written by Ross Copperman, Jon Nite, and Tully Kennedy and recorded by American country music artist Dierks Bentley. It was released in August 2012 as the fourth and final single from Bentley's 2012 album Home. This song is also Bentley's first single that he did not co-write.

Critical reception
Billy Dukes of Taste of Country gave the song four stars out of five, writing that "it’s as if you’re in the singer’s basement watching him jam with a few friendly pickers" and calling it "the most chill three-and-a-half minutes of music on country radio right now." Matt Bjorke of Roughstock gave the song a favorable review, saying that "the melody is moody and accentuates Dierks' vocal while also allowing the mandolins and other instrumentals to shine."

Kevin John Coyne of Country Universe gave the song a C grade, writing that "Bentley’s engaging enough of a personality and effective enough as a vocalist to keep the proceedings professional and competent [but the song] is just one of those forgettable songs that every time you hear it, it’s just a reminder that it exists."

Music video
The music video was directed by Wes Edwards and premiered in September 2012. It was filmed at the Georgia Theatre in Athens, Georgia.

Chart performance
"Tip It on Back" debuted at number 50 on the U.S. Billboard Hot Country Songs chart for the week of September 1, 2012. It also debuted at number 99 on the U.S. Billboard Hot 100 chart for the week of November 17, 2012.

Year-end charts

Certifications

References

2012 singles
Country ballads
2010s ballads
Dierks Bentley songs
Capitol Records Nashville singles
Songs written by Ross Copperman
Music videos directed by Wes Edwards
Song recordings produced by Brett Beavers
Songs written by Jon Nite
2012 songs